This is a list of Taiwanese dramas since 2021.

2021 to present

2021

2022

See also
 List of Taiwanese dramas from 2000 to 2010
 List of Taiwanese dramas from 2011 to 2020
 Taiwanese drama
 Television in Taiwan
 List of Chinese-language television channels
 List of Taiwanese television series

References

2021
Dramas
Dramas from 2021

ja:台湾ドラマ
zh:台灣偶像劇列表